Bombus trinominatus is a species of bumblebee native to Mexico and Guatemala.

This bee occurs in mountainous regions above 2572 meters in elevation. It is strongly associated with pine-oak forest ecosystems. It is not thought to be in decline at this time, though some of its potential habitat is endangered.

References

Bumblebees
Insects of Central America
Insects of Mexico
Insects described in 1890